Eugene S. Kaufman (September 28, 1922 - March 28, 1976) was a former member of the Wisconsin State Assembly.

Biography
Kaufman was born 1922 in Manitowoc, Wisconsin. He would graduate from Lincoln High School. During World War II, Kaufman served in the United States Army. He went on to be a member of the American Legion, Disabled American Veterans and AMVETS, as well as the Society of the Holy Name and the Knights of Columbus.

Political career
Kaufman was elected to the Assembly in 1962, 1964 and 1966. Additionally, he was a member of the Manitowoc County, Wisconsin Board. He is a Democrat.

References

People from Manitowoc, Wisconsin
County supervisors in Wisconsin
Democratic Party members of the Wisconsin State Assembly
Military personnel from Wisconsin
United States Army soldiers
United States Army personnel of World War II
1922 births
1976 deaths
20th-century American politicians